Events of 2022 in Zimbabwe.

Incumbents 

 President: Emmerson Mnangagwa
 Vice President
 Constantino Chiwenga

Events 
Ongoing: COVID-19 pandemic in Zimbabwe

 April 15 - At least 35 people are killed and 71 others are injured when a bus carrying churchgoers to an Easter gathering crashes in Chipinge.
 May 26 - Zimbabwean courts rule that the age of consent in Zimbabwe must be raised to 18.
 May 31 - Six African countries, on Zimbabwe's initiative, agree to restart trade in ivory as the population of elephants soars beyond sustainable levels.

Scheduled events

Deaths 

 January 27 – Gwinyai Chingoka, tennis player (b. 1982)
 February 14 - Charles Yohane, footballer (b. 1973)
 April 7 - Elvis Nyathi, refugee (b. 1979)
 April 24 - Collin Williams, cricket player (b. 1961)
 April 27 - John Gwitira, political activist (b. 1949)
 May 15 - Martin Munyanyi, Roman Catholic prelate (b. 1956)
 May 26 - Aldiglade Bhamu, footballer (b. 1987)
 May 28 - Christopher Kuruneri, politician (b. 1949)
 June 5 - Stanley Goreraza, military officer
 June 5 - Alex Magaisa, political advisor (b. 1975)
 May 27 - Mildred Reason Dube, politician
 May 27 - Giles Mutsekwa, politician (b. 1948)
 July 17 - Watson Khupe, politician (b. 1962)
 August 1 - Cont Mhlanga, actor (b. 1957)

See also 

COVID-19 pandemic in Africa
African Continental Free Trade Area

References 

 
2020s in Zimbabwe
Years of the 21st century in Zimbabwe
Zimbabwe